Marie-Hélène Valérie-Pierre (born 20 October 1978) is a Mauritian badminton player. She competed at the 2000 Summer Olympics in Sydney, Australia in the women's doubles event partnered with Amrita Sawaram, and in the mixed doubles event with Stephan Beehary. She also represented her country at the 1998 Commonwealth Games in Kuala Lumpur, Malaysia.

Achievements

African Championships 
Women's doubles

Mixed doubles

References

External links
 
 
 
 

1978 births
Living people
Mauritian female badminton players
Olympic badminton players of Mauritius
Badminton players at the 2000 Summer Olympics
Commonwealth Games competitors for Mauritius
Badminton players at the 1998 Commonwealth Games
Mauritian people of French descent